Dina Porat (born 24 September 1943 in Buenos Aires) is an Israeli historian. She is professor emeritus of modern Jewish history at the Department of Jewish History at Tel Aviv University and the chief historian of Yad Vashem.

Academic career
Dina Porat served as head of the Jewish History Department at Tel Aviv University's Stephen Roth Institute. She is head of the Kantor Center for the Study of Contemporary European Jewry and holds the Alfred P. Slaner Chair for the Study of Contemporary Antisemitism and Racism at Tel Aviv University.

She served as the academic adviser to the Task Force for International Cooperation on Holocaust Education, Remembrance, and Research. She is also an Advisory Board member of the Israel Council on Foreign Relations. Since 2011 she has served as chief historian of Yad Vashem.

Definition of anti-Semitism 
Porat participated in formulating an extended definition of anti-Semitism.

Awards and recognition
In 1988, Porat's book An Entangled Leadership, the Yishuv and the Holocaust 1942-1945, won the Yad Ben Zvi Award. In 2000, Dina Porat was one of the winners of the annual Buchman Memorial Prize for outstanding achievements in the field of Holocaust commemoration. The award was presented at Yad Vashem in Jerusalem. Porat received the prize for her book Beyond the Reaches of Our Soul: The Life and Times of Abba Kovner. In 2010, the book also won a National Jewish Book Award.

Published works

Books
An Entangled Leadership, the Yishuv and the Holocaust 1942-1945 (Am Oved, 1986, Hebrew). 
 The Blue and the Yellow Stars of David, The Zionist Leadership and the Holocaust, 1939-1945 (Harvard University Press, 1990) (in English). The book was nominated for the National Jewish Book Award, in the U.S.A., 1991. 
 Avraham Tory, Surviving the Holocaust, edited and with an introduction by Martin Gilbert, textual and historical notes by Dina Porat (Harvard University Press, May 1990) (in English).
Edited, When Holocaust comes from Afar, Leading Personalities in the Land of Israel Confront Nazism and the Holocaust, 1933-1948 (Yad Ben-Zvi, Jerusalem, 2009, Hebrew). 
Israeli Society, the Holocaust and its Survivors, Research Essays (Vallentine Mitchell, 2008), and Hebrew version, The Smoke-Smelling Morning Coffee (Am Oved and Yad Vashem, 2011).

Articles
 "What makes an anti-Semite", Haaretz, January 28, 2007.

References

External links
 A review of Dina Porat's biography of Abba Kovner
 http://www.kantorcenter.tau.ac.il/

Living people
Israeli historians
Israeli women historians
Academic staff of Tel Aviv University
Yad Vashem people
Argentine emigrants to Israel
1943 births